Han Jin-won (born 1986) is a South Korean screenwriter. He is best known for his work on Parasite as writer, which earned him critical appraisal and recognition including an Academy Award for Best Original Screenplay at the 92nd Academy Awards in 2020. He shared this award with Bong Joon-ho, and this made the two of them the first Asian writers to win any screenwriting Academy Award.

Filmography

References

External links 
 

1986 births
Living people
Best Original Screenplay Academy Award winners
Best Original Screenplay BAFTA Award winners
South Korean screenwriters